Nikola Borisov (Bulgarian: Никола Борисов; born 21 November 2000) is a Bulgarian footballer who plays as a defender for Dunav Ruse, on loan from Spartak Varna.

Career
Borisov started his career in the local CSKA Sofia Academy at age of 7. In 2018 he was called up for the first team, after his good season with U19 team and the second team. In 2019 he was send on loan to Litex Lovech and Neftochimic Burgas, before being released in 2021 and join the amateur team Nadezhda Dobroslavtsi.

In July 2021 Borisov joined the returned to Second League team of Spartak Varna, establishing himself in the starting team and helping the team to secure his return to First League.Никола Борисов: Спартак (Вн) трябва да се върне в елита и никога да не го напуска Borisov scored his debut top league goal on 20 August 2022 in a league defeat against Arda KArdzhali.

Career statistics

Club

References

External links
 

2000 births
Living people
Bulgarian footballers
Bulgaria youth international footballers
PFC CSKA Sofia players
PFC Litex Lovech players
Neftochimic Burgas players
PFC Spartak Varna players
FC Dunav Ruse players
First Professional Football League (Bulgaria) players
Association football defenders